Sauvagella robusta is a small species of fish in the family Clupeidae. It is endemic to the Amboaboa and Mangarahara River Basins in northern Madagascar. Its current conservation status is unclear, but the cichlid Ptychochromis insolitus, which is highly threatened from habitat loss, is native to the same region. Sauvagella robusta is known to survive at least in Lake Tseny.

References

Sauvagella
Freshwater fish of Madagascar
Taxonomy articles created by Polbot
Fish described in 2002